The 1967 World Judo Championships were the 5th edition of the Men's World Judo Championships, and were held in Salt Lake City, United States from 9–11 August, 1967.

Medal overview

Men

Medal table

References

External links
 results on judoinside.com retrieved December 12, 2013

World Championships
J
J
World Judo Championships
J
World Judo Championships